Anthony John Moor (born 18 January 1940) is an English former footballer who made 296 appearances playing as a goalkeeper in the Football League for York City and Darlington in the 1960s and 1970s. Before joining York City, he played non-league football for Scarborough. He was ever-present as Darlington were promoted to the Third Division in 1965–66 as Fourth Division runners-up.

Moor played for Scarborough Cricket Club for many years, captaining them to the Yorkshire League title three times in the 1970s and to the National Club Knockout Competition in 1976 and 1979. He played for the National Cricket Association XI against the touring Canadian team in 1974, and for the Yorkshire League XI against the West Indies tourists in 1973 and the Pakistanis in 1974.

References

1940 births
Living people
Cricketers from Scarborough, North Yorkshire
English footballers
Association football goalkeepers
Scarborough F.C. players
York City F.C. players
Darlington F.C. players
English Football League players
English cricketers
Footballers from North Yorkshire
English cricketers of 1969 to 2000